Noble outlaw may refer to:

 Ishikawa Goemon, semi-legendary outlaw of the Japanese Sengoku period
 Robin Hood, legendary outlaw of Sherwood Forest in medieval England
 Tupac Shakur, rapper

See also
 Folk hero
 Outlaw

Outlaws